Arthur Forbes, 9th Laird of Culloden DL FRSE  (1819-1879) was a noted Scottish landowner and amateur botanist. He was Deputy Lieutenant of Nairn and Ross. He was a descendant of Duncan Forbes of Culloden.

Life

He was born at Douglas on the Isle of Man on 25 January 1819 the son of Duncan George Forbes of Culloden (1781-1840) and his wife, Sarak Walker (d.1838). He was educated at Aberdeen and then Cambridge University.

In 1843 he was elected a Fellow of the Royal Society of Edinburgh. His proposer was John Cockburn.

He died at Aldershot on 16 March 1879.

Family

In 1849 he married Sarah Georgina Warrand (d.1879).

References

1819 births
1879 deaths
Fellows of the Royal Society of Edinburgh
Alumni of the University of Cambridge
Scottish botanists
Lairds
Scottish landowners
People from Douglas, Isle of Man
Alumni of the University of Aberdeen
19th-century Scottish businesspeople